Vikram Rathour  (born 26 March 1969, Jalandhar, Punjab) is a former Indian cricketer & Cricket Coach, who played in 6 Tests and 7 ODIs from 1996 to 1997. He was a right-handed opening batsman. Rathour was a prolific run scorer at the first class level, scoring 11,473 runs at an average of 49.66 in 146 matches. This included several fluent, stroke-filled centuries. His List A career was more modest, with him scoring just over 3000 runs in 99 matches. He is the current batting coach of the Indian cricket team.

BCCI National Selector from North Zone

On 27 September 2012 Vikram Rathour was appointed as the national selector from the North Zone.

International career
Vikram Rathour officially announced his retirement from first-class cricket in November 2003. In his test career, he scored 131 runs in 10 innings and six matches with a highest of 44 in his appearance against South Africa at The Wanderers. Rathour was the member of the team that won the Ranji Trophy under the direction of coach Bishan Singh Bedi.

Coaching career
He was appointed as batting coach for Indian cricket team.
In November 2021, he was reappointed as batting coach of the Indian national cricket team based on his success with the team.

References

1969 births
Living people
India Test cricketers
India One Day International cricketers
Indian cricketers
North Zone cricketers
Punjab, India cricketers
Himachal Pradesh cricketers
Cricketers from Jalandhar
Indian Premier League coaches
India national cricket team selectors
Indian cricket coaches
Wicket-keepers